Vada is an unincorporated community in northern Texas County, in the U.S. state of Missouri. The community is located on Missouri Route 32, approximately three miles northeast of Success.

History
A post office called Vada was established in 1917, and remained in operation until 1929. An early postmaster named the community after his daughter, Nevada "Vada" Jackson.

References

Unincorporated communities in Texas County, Missouri
Unincorporated communities in Missouri